The SEAT 1200 Sport is a two-door, four-seater coupé developed by the Spanish car maker SEAT. First presented in December 1975, and sold commercially from February 1976 to September 1979, it was the first car developed entirely in the company's newly opened Martorell Technical Centre. Despite its sporting aspirations, its power output was limited by a relatively low compression ratio, reflecting the fuel octane levels available in its home market.

The 1200 Sport's sharp-edged body design had a drag coefficient (cd) of 0.37. It was purchased from NSU of Germany, after the German firm abandoned its plans to launch the NSU Nergal, its own small sports car based on the rear-engined NSU Prinz, presented as a prototype in the 1970 Turin Motor Show and designed by Italian designer Aldo Sessano. Antoni Amat, technical director of Inducar (Industrias de la Carrocería, an external provider for SEAT) proposed the 1200 Sport project to SEAT, with the mediation of Günter Óistrach, after the former's visit and contacts at the Turin Motor Show. The Terrassa-based Inducar company undertook the production of the car's chassis. To fit the platform SEAT planned for the car, the Nergal design was modified to include elements of another of Sessano's concept cars, the OTAS KL112, as it was based on the Fiat 127. A characteristic of  the original NSU Nergal design that remained in the production model was the air-vents in the third pillar, just above the rear wheel arch, likely indicating the presence of the rear-mounted engine in NSU's design. SEAT's engineers examined the possibility of keeping the rear-engine layout, but ultimately chose a front engine. The car's boot featured remote opening through a handle on the driver's door, and had a fuel capacity of 339 litres.

In 1977, the SEAT 1430 Sport Coupé was introduced, using the same body, but with a retuned version of the engine from the SEAT 1430.

The Sport versions were offered mainly in the Spanish market, but also some cars were officially offered in other European countries such as Germany, Holland, Belgium, and France. Both models, 1200 and 1430, were discontinued in 1979, along with the SEAT 128, SEAT 133, and CKD-built Lancia Beta and Beta HPE, as part of the important restructuring of the SEAT range for 1980. A total of 19,332 units was sold in the Spanish market, with 11,619 cars being equipped with the 1200 engine and some 7,713 units with the more powerful but late-launched 1430 motor.

The car was widely known as the "Boca negra" ("black mouth" in Spanish) because of the color and shape of its always black plastic front panel, which embraced the front grille and the headlights and incorporated, by 1970s standards, a prominent front bumper.  In 2008, SEAT presented the SEAT Bocanegra concept car at the Geneva Motor Show. It received this name as a homage to the classic 1200 Sport, as it also had a black front end. It is sold as a special-edition Ibiza model from the second half of 2009, based on the SEAT Ibiza FR and Cupra versions.

Production figures
Since its launch in 1975 up to 1981, 19,332 SEAT 1200 and 1430 Sport cars have been sold and produced (11,619 units for the SEAT 1200 Sport and 7,713 for the SEAT 1430 Sport version).

The total production per year of SEAT 1200 Sport and SEAT 1430 Sport cars is shown in the following table :

References

External links 
CLUB SEAT 1200 y 128 SPORT de España

1200
Cars introduced in 1975
Cars discontinued in 1979
Cars of Spain